Kremenchuk (Velyka Kokhnivka) Airport  is an airport in the Poltava Oblast, Ukraine. It is located at 5 km in the North-East of the Kremenchuk city.

References

External links
 General Airport Information

Kremenchuk
Airports in Ukraine
Buildings and structures in Poltava Oblast